Dushyant Kumar Gautam is an  Indian politician. He is a National General Secretary of the Bhartiya Janata Party. He was elected to the Rajya Sabha the upper house of Indian Parliament from Haryana as a member of the  Bharatiya Janata Party. He has been associated with the SC Morch of the BJP for quite a long time. He has also contested MCD and Delhi assembly unsuccessfully in the past. He served the remaining 2.5 years term during 2020-2022 of former INLD leader Ram Kumar Kashyap who resigned after being elected an MLA from Indri constituency of Karnal district in Haryana.

References

1957 births
Living people
Bharatiya Janata Party politicians from Haryana
Rajya Sabha members from Haryana